Interstate 10 (I-10) is a part of the Interstate Highway System that runs from Santa Monica, California, to Jacksonville, Florida. In Alabama, the Interstate Highway runs  from the Mississippi state line near Grand Bay east to the Florida state line at the Perdido River. I-10 is the primary east–west highway of the Gulf Coast region of Alabama. The highway connects Mobile, the largest city in South Alabama, with Pascagoula, Mississippi, to the west and Pensacola, Florida, to the east. Within the state, the highway connects Mobile and Mobile County with the Baldwin County communities of Daphne and Fairhope. I-10 connects Mobile and Baldwin County by crossing the northern end of Mobile Bay and the southern end of the Mobile-Tensaw River Delta via the George Wallace Tunnel in Mobile and the Jubilee Parkway viaduct system between Mobile and Daphne.

Route description
I-10 enters Mobile County from Jackson County, Mississippi, near just north of where US Route 90 (US 90) crosses the state line near Grand Bay. The four-lane freeway has an eastbound welcome center ahead of its first interchange, a diamond interchange with the western end of State Route 188 (SR 188) due north of the center of Grand Bay. I-10 continues east-northeast through a partial cloverleaf interchange with County Road 39 (CR 39) north of Irvington. The highway crosses the Fowl River and curves more northeast through a diamond interchange with CR 30 (Theodore Dawes Road) west of the community of Theodore. I-10 expands to six lanes ahead of a pair of interchanges near Tillmans Corner: a partial cloverleaf interchange with US 90 (Government Boulevard) and a full cloverleaf interchange with SR 193 (Rangeline Road).

I-10 enters the city of Mobile at Halls Mill Creek just east of SR 193. The highway has a directional-T interchange with the southern end of I-65, which serves Montgomery and Birmingham. I-10 continues northeast from I-65 as an eight-lane freeway that parallels CSX's NO&M Subdivision rail line. The highway has a complex interchange with SR 163 (Dauphin Island Parkway) just east of the Dog River; the interchange includes a flyover from southbound SR 163 to eastbound I-10 and a left-ramp flyover from westbound I-10 to southbound SR 163. I-10 and the railroad form the northern margin of Mobile Aeroplex at Brookley (formerly Brookley Air Force Base), along which the freeway has a partial cloverleaf interchange with Michigan Avenue. North of the airport, the interstate has a pair of half-diamond interchanges with Duval Street and Broad Street; the half-interchanges are connected by a one-way pair of frontage roads.

I-10 crosses over a Canadian National Railway/Illinois Central Railroad rail line and leaves the CSX rail line as it curves north toward downtown Mobile. The freeway has a four-ramp partial cloverleaf junction with Virginia Street and a pair of half-diamond interchanges with Texas Street (southbound exit, northbound entrance) and Canal Street (northbound exit, southbound exit). North of Canal Street, I-10 has a directional-T interchange with Water Street, which provides access to downtown Mobile. Within that interchange, the freeway reduces to four lanes and curves east and descends into the George Wallace Tunnel to pass under the Mobile River. I-10 resurfaces on Blakeley Island and has an interchange with US 90 and US 98 (Battleship Parkway) west of Battleship Memorial Park.

I-10 leaves Blakeley Island, the city of Mobile, and Mobile County on Jubilee Parkway, a dual-viaduct crossing of several rivers at the northern end of Mobile Bay. The first major segment is a crossing of Polecat Bay, and the confluence of the Spanish River and the Tensaw River, within which the interstate enters Baldwin County. The viaduct continues through a cut in an island, then continues across Chacaloochee Bay, within which the freeway has a diamond interchange with US 90 and US 98 (Battleship Parkway), which mostly follow causeways across the great expanse of water. Beyond the interchange, I-10 continues across the bay and the mouth of the Apalachee River, Bay John, the mouth of the Blakeley River, and D'Olive Bay. The dual viaducts reach the eastern shore just west of a five-ramp partial cloverleaf interchange with US 90 and US 98 south of the center of Spanish Fort and north of Fairhope.

I-10 continues east as a four-lane freeway along the northern edge of the city of Daphne. The freeway has a diverging diamond interchange with SR 181 (Malbis Plantation Parkway) in the northeastern corner of the city near the hamlet of Malbis. I-10 has a four-ramp partial cloverleaf interchange with SR 59 on the northern edge of Loxley. The interstate crosses the Fish River and has a diamond interchange with the Baldwin Beach Express, a new county highway that connects I-10 with the beach communities of Gulf Shores and Orange Beach. I-10 has one more interchange in Alabama, a diamond interchange with CR 64 (Wilcox Road). Beyond CR 64, the freeway parallels and then crosses the Styx River, then the westbound highway has a welcome center just west of the Perdido River, where I-10 leaves Alabama and enters Escambia County, Florida, and Pensacola.

Exit list

See also

References

External links

 

Transportation in Mobile County, Alabama
Transportation in Baldwin County, Alabama
Transportation in Mobile, Alabama
 Alabama